"Gabriel" is a song written by Joe Goddard, Valentina, and John Beck and produced by Joe Goddard, featuring vocals from Valentina. It was released as a Digital download in the United Kingdom on 31 July 2011. It peaked to number 49 on the UK Singles Chart and 12 on the Belgian (Flemish) Singles Chart. A remix of the song is featured on the video game Grand Theft Auto V in the radio station Soulwax FM.

Music video
A music video to accompany the release of "Gabriel" was first released onto YouTube on 31 August 2011 at a total length of three minutes and forty-four seconds. The video is by Utile Creative and Jazz Goddard.

Track listing
UK Digital EP

 "Gabriel" (feat. Valentina) - 5:36
 "All I Know" - 9:22 
 "Jump"  - 6:28
 "Gabriel" (Dub) (feat. Valentina) - 7:05

Chart performance

Release history

References

Joe Goddard (musician) songs
2011 singles
2011 songs
Songs written by John Beck (songwriter)
Songs written by Joe Goddard (musician)